Choi Gil-Soo (born November 12, 1944) is a former football referee from  South Korea. He officiated at the 1988 Olympic tournament in Seoul.

References

FIFA Profile

1944 births
Living people
South Korean football referees
Olympic football referees